Lili Pancu (1908-2006) was a Romanian painter in the 20th century. She studied at the Bucharest Belle Arte school with Cecilia Cutescu-Storck, Ipolit Strâmbu and Jean Steriadi. At the age of 22 she received the 
Anastase Simu prize and the prize of the city of Bucharest. She continued painting well after the age of 70 in her "well tempered modernist style".

References

Sources

1908 births
2006 deaths
20th-century Romanian painters
Romanian women artists
20th-century women artists